HGL may refer to:
Heligoland Airfield, on the German island of Düne
Hengelo railway station, in the Netherlands
Henry George League, an Australian political party